Grace Wong Kwan-hing (born 5 May 1986) is a Hong Kong television actress and singer formerly contracted to TVB. She is best known for her role as Fa Man in the martial arts television drama A Fist Within Four Walls.

Early life 
Grace Wong was born in Hong Kong and emigrated to the United States with her family at the age of four. She grew up in Brooklyn and Queens in New York City. She attended Babson College and went to Hong Kong for an exchange program at the Chinese University of Hong Kong.

Career 
In 2007, Grace Wong's career began by winning in beauty pageants. On 21 July 2007, Wong returned to Hong Kong from New York City, New York (state), U.S. and entered in the 35th Miss Hong Kong pageant as contestant No. 9. Wong was the first runner up at the Miss Hong Kong 2007 beauty pageant as well as winning the Miss Photogenic and Miss International Goodwill awards. At the Miss International 2007 pageant, Wong also made top 15 at the pageant, as well as Miss Friendship. After signing a contract with TVB, Wong made her acting debut with a cameo appearance in the 2009 drama Born Rich.

In 2016, Wong gained recognition in the critical acclaimed martial arts drama A Fist Within Four Walls. With her role as Fa Man, Wong won the Most Popular Female Character award at the 2016 TVB Anniversary Awards.

In December 2021, Wong announced via Weibo and Instagram that her contract with TVB had ended.

Personal life
Grace Wong has publicly declared that she is a devout Christian.

Wong is close friends with Linda Chung, Eliza Sam, Leanne Li and Christine Kuo.

In 2017, Wong got married with her boyfriend, Daniel Chang.

Filmography

Television dramas

Film
 From Vegas to Macau III (2016) – Interpol police.
 Line Walker (2016) – CIB detective.
 The Beauty (2016)
 Line Walker 2 (2019)
 Sakra (2023) – Kang Min.

Discography
 她最好-Ghost Dragon of Cold Mountain
Casada

References

External links
 
Official TVB Blog 
Grace Wong at Sina Weibo 
Miss HK Beauties 2007

1986 births
Living people
Actresses from New York City
Hong Kong emigrants to the United States
21st-century Hong Kong women singers
Hong Kong film actresses
Hong Kong television actresses
Hong Kong women television presenters
Miss International 2007 delegates
Musicians from Queens, New York
People from Flushing, Queens
American people of Chinese descent
21st-century Hong Kong actresses
Hong Kong Christians
21st-century American actresses
Babson College alumni